Yasir Saeed Mohammad (born 10 October 2002) is an American cricketer, who plays as a bowler for the United States national cricket team. He also plays for the Manhattan Yorkers in Minor League Cricket.

Career 
Mohammad was born in Edison, New Jersey to a Pakistani immigrant family on 10 October 2002. He lives in New Jersey.

Mohammad started playing cricket at the age of 12 in New Jersey. A right-arm leg-break and googly bowler, he made his Twenty20 International (T20I) debut against Ireland on 22 December 2021. He was selected to play for the New Jersey Somerset Cavaliers for the inaugural season of Minor League Cricket before transferring over to the Manhattan Yorkers for the 2022 season.

In May 2022, he was named in the USA's One Day International (ODI) squads for round 12 and round 13 of the 2019–2023 ICC Cricket World Cup League 2 tournament. He made his ODI debut on 8 June 2022, for the United States against Oman.

References

2002 births
Living people
American cricketers
United States One Day International cricketers
United States Twenty20 International cricketers
Cricketers from New Jersey
American sportspeople of Pakistani descent